Matteo di Guaro Allio (1605–1670) was an Italian sculptor of the Baroque period, active mainly in Padua. Born in Scaria, in Lombardy, he produced some of the sculpture for the lateral pilasters of the Capella dell'arca of the Basilica of Saint Anthony of Padua. He worked there alongside Girolamo Pironi. Matteo was the brother of Tommaso Allio, also sculptor and architect in Padua.

Sources

 Getty ULAN entry.

Italian Baroque sculptors
Italian male sculptors
17th-century Italian architects
People from the Province of Como
1605 births
1670 deaths